The 2019–20 FIU Panthers men's basketball team represented Florida International University in the 2019–20 NCAA Division I men's basketball season. The Panthers, led by second-year head coach Jeremy Ballard, played their home games at Ocean Bank Convocation Center in Miami, Florida as members of Conference USA. They finished the season 19–13, 9–9 in CUSA play to finish in fifth place. They defeated Rice in the first round of the C-USA tournament and were set to face Charlotte in the quarterfinals before the remainder of the tournament was canceled amid the COVID-19 pandemic.

Previous season
The Panthers finished the 2018–19 season 20–14 overall, 10–8 in C-USA play to finish in 7th place. In the C-USA tournament, they were defeated by North Texas in the first round. They were invited to the CIT, where they defeated Texas State in the first round before falling to Green Bay in the second round.

Roster

Schedule and results

|-
!colspan=12 style=| Non-conference regular season

|-
!colspan=12 style=| Conference USA regular season

|-
!colspan=9 style=| Conference USA tournament
|-

|-

|-

Source

References

FIU Panthers men's basketball seasons
FIU Panthers
FIU Panthers men's basketball
FIU Panthers men's basketball